Willy Rist was a Swiss diver. He competed in the men's 10 metre platform event at the 1948 Summer Olympics.

References

External links
 

Year of birth missing
Possibly living people
Swiss male divers
Olympic divers of Switzerland
Divers at the 1948 Summer Olympics
Place of birth missing (living people)
Date of birth missing (living people)